This is the order of battle for 2016-2017 Turkish cross-border military offensive, codenamed "Operation Euphrates Shield" by Turkey.

Turkey and allied forces 

 Turkish Armed Forces
  Turkish Land Forces
 Third Army
 57th Commando Regiment
 General Staff
   Special forces
  Turkish Naval Forces
  Underwater Offence (Turkish Armed Forces)
 SAS EOD (Explosive Ordnance Disposal)
 Amphibious Marine Brigade (Turkish Armed Forces)
 Turkish Air Force
8th Main Jet Base Group Command (8. Ana Jet Üs Komutanlığı) (Diyarbakır)
 181st Squadron "Leopard" (181. Filo "Pars") - F-16C/D Block 40TM/Block 50+ Fighting Falcon (LANTIRN-specialised)
 182nd Squadron "Accipiter" (182. Filo "Atmaca") - F-16C/D Block 40 Fighting Falcon
 202nd Liaison and SAR Squadron "East" (202. İrtibat ve Arama-Kurtarma Filosu "Şark") - CN-235M-100, AS-532UL Mk.1+
 9th Main Jet Base Command (9. Ana Jet Üs Komutanlığı) (Balıkesir)
 Hawar Kilis Operations Room
  Sultan Murad Division
  Mehmed the Conqueror Brigade
  Levant Front
  Descendants of Saladin Brigade
  Hamza Division
  Free Syria Brigade
 Samarkand Brigade
  Al-Moutasem Brigade
  Fastaqim Union
  Sham Legion
  Elite Army
 Free Idlib Army
  13th Division
  Mountain Hawks Brigade(until 17 September)
  Free Men of the East Brigade
 Conquest Brigade
 Syria Revolutionaries Front remnants
Military Councils:
  Akhtarin Military Council
  Al-Bab Military Council
  Tal Rifaat Military Council 
  Qabasin Military Council
  Mare Military Council
 Syrian Turkmen Brigades
  Sultan Malik-Shah Brigade
  Muntasar Billah Brigade
 Ahrar al-Sham
 Army of Sunna
 Authenticity and Development Front

Support:
 United States Armed Forces
  United States Air Force
  United States special operations forces
  United States Army
 Russian Armed Forces
  Aerospace Forces
 British Armed Forces
  Royal Air Force

 ISIL 
 Military of ISIL
 Wilayat Halab

 Syrian Democratic Forces and allied forces 
 Syrian Democratic Forces
  Manbij Military Council
 Northern Sun Battalion
  Seljuq Brigade
  Manbij Revolutionaries Battalion
 Jarabulus Military Council
 Euphrates Jarabulus Brigades
 Free Jarabulus Brigades
 Jarabulus Hawks Brigades
  YPG
  YPJ
 Anti-Terror Units Northern Democratic Brigade
 International Freedom Battalion
  MLKP
  TKP/ML TİKKO
 United Freedom Forces
  Bob Crow Brigade
  Antifascist Internationalist TaburSupport: United States Armed Forces
  United States Air Force
  United States special operations forces

 Syrian Government and allied forces 

  Syrian Armed ForcesSupport:'''
 Russian Armed Forces
  Aerospace Forces

Notes

References

Euphrates Shield, Operation